Bruce Burns (born June 30, 1952) is a Republican member of the Wyoming Senate, representing the 21st district  since 2003. He previously served in the House from 1995 to 2002.

References

1952 births
Living people
Republican Party Wyoming state senators
Republican Party members of the Wyoming House of Representatives
University of Colorado alumni
21st-century American politicians